"Spaceship" is a single by recording artist Tinchy Stryder and hip hop vocalist Dappy. It was meant to be the first single released from his fourth studio album entitled, Full Tank but Full Tank was scrapped making it a non-album single. It was released on 12 June 2011 as a digital download. The single features vocals from Rapper/singer Dappy of N-Dubz, as well as uncredited back up vocals from Tulisa Contostavlos, also from N-Dubz. This is Tinchy Stryder's first top five single since 2009.

Music video
The music video was filmed in Portofino, Liguria, North-Western Italy, by United Kingdom directors Kwasi Danquah III, Luke Monaghan & James Barber, to accompany the release of "Spaceship". British fashion model and 2010 Miss England finalist, Pascal Craymer, makes a cameo in the video. The video was premiered on Tinchy Stryder's YouTube channel on 25 April 2011 and reached 1 million views on 8 May 2011. The video has now reached nearly 6 million .

Track listing

Critical reception
Lewis Corner of Digital Spy gave the song a positive review stating:

It's been a rocky few months for Tinchy Stryder. After catapulting to the upper echelons of the charts with his debut LP and its subsequent spinoff singles, the pint-sized rapper suffered a textbook case of follow-up album syndrome, failing to replicate his success second time around. Determined to push forward, he's re-teamed with original chart-topping collaborators N-Dubz in a bid to regain his former chart glory. He and the Grime music trio's frontman/serial "Dappy hat's" offender Dappy split rhymes that reminisce on how far they've come in the biz - with girls, cars, gadgets and blingin' designer clobber now all at their disposal. "I'm a f**king star/ have you seen my car?" boasts Tinchy, while Dapz admits: "My momma thought I wouldn't make it/ But now she's living in a spaceship," over a watery stew of club beats and pulsating synths that lack any real oomph or lyrical resonance. Not to worry, Tinch, there's always that rainy day fund, right? RIGHT?

Chart performance

Weekly charts

Year-end charts

Release history

References

2011 singles
2011 songs
Tinchy Stryder songs
Dappy songs
Takeover Entertainment singles
Songs with music by Tinchy Stryder
Songs written by Dappy